Arthur Gander (27 November 1909 – 30 March 1981) was a Swiss gymnast. He was honored in the International Gymnastics Hall of Fame in 1997. Gander was president of the International Gymnastics Federation.

References

External links 
Olympedia profile

1909 births
1981 deaths
People from Brienz
Swiss male artistic gymnasts
Sportspeople from the canton of Bern
20th-century Swiss people